The National Changhua Living Art Center is an arts center in Changhua City, Changhua County, Taiwan.

History
The center was established in 1955.

See also
 List of tourist attractions in Taiwan

References

External links

  

1955 establishments in Taiwan
Art centers in Changhua County
Art galleries established in 1955
Changhua City